Galaksija Plus was an improved version of Galaksija, with 256x208 monochrome graphics mode, 3-voice sound based on AY-3-8910 and 48 KiB RAM.

The hardware of Galaksija Plus was created by Nenad Dunjić and software by Milan Tadić in 1985. The goal was to enhance original Galaksija while keeping the original goal of keeping things inexpensive and simple for the constructor.

Continuing to use Static RAM in Galaksija Plus would have significantly increased the cost, so designers decided to switch to dynamic, built out of 4416 chips. Larger memory prompted the need for faster cassette tape data recording rate, which was increased to 1200 bit/s by modifying another piece of firmware.

Having enough memory to store the bit map and since Galaksija's own CPU directly drove the video signal, video generation hardware did not have to change significantly. Video generation routine was modified to take the raw video data from the new video memory instead of relying on character set ROMs. Some games for original Galaksija used to do a similar trick, albeit in a limited fashion due to restrictive memory capacity.

The final hardware upgrade was addition of AY-3-8910 sound-generation chip, providing contemporary-standard sound to Galaksija without the need to use tricks such as with the cassette tape port (see original Galaksija).

Galaksija Plus featured new software additions: Graphic primitives in BASIC language - commands to draw lines, boxes, circles, other graphic primitives as well as drawing text on graphical screen with different font. Additional firmware (ROM C) also featured Full Screen Source Editor and soft scrolling.

Galaksija Plus was manufactured by Institute for School Books and Teaching Aids for an announced price of 140,000 dinars.

Specifications
CPU: ZiLOG Z80A 3.072 MHz
ROMs:
Original ROM "A" or "1" - 4 KB (in 2764 EPROM together with ROM "B") contains bootstrap, core control and Galaksija BASIC interpreter code
Original ROM "B" or "2" - 4 KB (in 2764 EPROM together with ROM "A") - additional Galaksija BASIC commands, assembler, Machine code monitor, etc.
Additional ROM "C" or "3" - 2 KB (in 2716 EPROM) - additional firmware specific to Galaksija Plus (e.g. graphics mode drivers and handling)
Character ROM - 2 KB (2716 EPROM) contains character definitions
RAM: 48 KB of 4416 dynamic RAM, 46 KB accessible
Text mode 32 x 16 characters, monochrome
Graphics mode: 256x208
Sound: 3-channels + white noise provided by AY-3-8912.
Storage media: cassette tape, recording at either 280 or 1200 bit/s rate
I/O ports: 44-pin Edge connector with Z80 Bus, tape (DIN connector), monochrome video out (PAL timings, DIN connector), UHF TV out (RCA connector) and two 8-bit parallel ports (e.g. printer and general port)

See also
 Galaksija (computer)

Home computers
Galaksija (computer)